Anelaphus robi is a species of beetle in the family Cerambycidae. It was described by Hrabovsky in 1987.

References

Anelaphus
Beetles described in 1987